Naduvalur (East) is a village in the Udayarpalayam taluk of Ariyalur district, Tamil Nadu, India.

Demographics 

As per the 2001 census, Naduvalur (East) had a total population of 1573 with 763 males and 810 females.

References 

Villages in Ariyalur district